In sports, a scorigami (a portmanteau of score and origami) is a scoring combination that has never happened before in a sport or league's history. The term was originated by sportswriter Jon Bois for National Football League scores and is primarily used in this context.

History
The term was coined by SB Nation sportswriter Jon Bois in 2016 and most commonly refers to scores in American football, particularly in the National Football League (NFL). Bois charted all of the unique scores in professional football since the inaugural season of the American Professional Football Association in 1920. Due to the unusual point values in football compared to other team sports, the distribution of the chart was irregular. Bois noted scorelines that could occur but had not yet done so, referring to the occurrence of a never before seen scoreline as "scorigami". As an example, the Seattle Seahawks' 43–8 win over the Denver Broncos in Super Bowl XLVIII was scorigami, as no prior NFL game had ever finished 43–8.

A notable feature of the chart that Bois created was the highly unlikely possibility, never fulfilled, of a team ending a game with a single point due to the potential for the defense to score a conversion safety. This renders 1-point totals theoretically possible for the losing side against opposition scores either exactly 6, or 8 or more.

Since the term's inception, a Twitter bot has tracked scorigamis in the NFL. The most recent scorigami for an NFL game was when the Cincinnati Bengals defeated the New England Patriots by a score of 22–18 on December 24, 2022, being the 1,075th unique score.

Bois and other media observers have noted the tendency of the Seattle Seahawks under head coach Pete Carroll to create scorigamis; Bois dubbed Carroll "the wizard of modern Scorigami, without question". From 2011 to 2018, the Seahawks had exactly one scorigami per season. Carroll himself has acknowledged his team's frequent scorigamis, joking to reporters after another game with a unique score: 

There has been occasional uses of the term for other sports. On September 9, 2020, Major League Baseball (MLB) had its first scorigami in 21 years, a 29–9 victory by the Atlanta Braves over the Miami Marlins—the previous scorigami for an MLB game had been a 24–12 win by the Cincinnati Reds over the Colorado Rockies on May 19, 1999.

References

External links 
 NFL Scorigami website
 Chart Party: Scorigami, or the story of every NFL final score that has ever happened
 ESPN video on Scorigami

2016 neologisms
National Football League culture
Portmanteaus
SB Nation
Sports records and statistics
Statistical analysis